Classical Academic Press publishes books and K–12 curriculum (including Latin, Greek, Spanish, science, logic, writing, rhetoric, grammar, poetry, literature, history) with the motto, “Classical Subjects Creatively Taught.” The press started in 2001 as a privately-owned publishing company with multiple partners, including CEO and cofounder Christopher Perrin, to develop and publish classical curricula and media. The press is recognized as a leading provider of independent and public charter schools as well as homeschools influenced by the renewal of classical education and classical Christian education.

Publications

In addition to student texts and resources, the press publishes books such as The Liberal Arts Tradition: A Philosophy of Classical Christian Education by Kevin Clark and Ravi Jain with a foreword by Peter Kreeft (2021, 3rd edition), The Myth Made Fact: Reading Greek and Roman Mythology through Christian Eyes by Louis Markos (2020), and The Black Intellectual Tradition: Reading Freedom in Classical Literature by Angel Adams Parham and Anika Prather (2022).

Imprints and other services

In 2020, Classical Academic Press acquired Novare Science & Math from John Mays and has continued development of its curriculum under the Novare Science imprint.

Classical Academic Press also offers live online classes for students in grades 3 to 6 through Scholé Academy, online teacher training courses through ClasscialU.com, support to local homeschool co-ops and hybrid model schools through the Scholé Communities network, and hosts multiple shows on the TrueNorth Podcast Network.

External links 
 Classical Academic Press, primary website 
 Novare Science, imprint of Classical Academic Press carrying science curriculum
 Scholé Academy, providing live online courses for students grades 3 to 12 (owned and operated by Classical Academic Press)
 ClassicalU.com, online teacher training courses in an asynchronous and self-paced format (owned and operated by Classical Academic Press)
 Scholé Communities, a network of homeschool and school communities (owned and operated by Classical Academic Press)
 TrueNorth Podcast Network, a network of podcast shows (owned and operated by Classical Academic Press)

References

Christian publishing companies
Publishing companies established in 2001
Educational publishing companies of the United States